Middle East mythology includes:
Mythologies of the Ancient Near East
Mesopotamian myths
 Egyptian mythology
 Hittite mythology and religion
Abrahamic religions 
 Islamic mythology 
 Jewish mythology
 Christian mythology
Mythologies of individual ethnic groups in the Middle East
 Religion in pre-Islamic Arabia

See also
Middle Eastern folklore (disambiguation)
Religion in the Middle East